Hermanus Lodevicus Willebrordus "Manus" Vrauwdeunt (29 April 1915 – 8 June 1982) is a former Dutch footballer who was active as a midfielder and forward. Vrauwdeunt played his whole career at Feijenoord and won one cap for the Netherlands, a friendly match against Switzerland (2–1 victory) on 7 March 1937.

Honours
 1935–36 : Eredivisie winner with Feijenoord
 1937–38 : Eredivisie winner with Feijenoord
 1939–40 : Eredivisie winner with Feijenoord

References

External links
 Profile

1915 births
1982 deaths
Dutch footballers
Feyenoord players
Association football midfielders
Association football forwards
Footballers from Rotterdam
Netherlands international footballers
1934 FIFA World Cup players